Hung Out to Dry may refer to:
Hung Out to Dry (song), a 2006 song by Fu Manchu
Hung Out to Dry (NCIS), the second episode of the first season of the crime drama television series NCIS
Hung Out to Dry (CSI: NY episode), the fourth episode of the third season of the crime drama television series CSI: NY